The giant clams are the members of the clam genus Tridacna that are the largest living bivalve mollusks. There are actually several species of "giant clams" in the genus Tridacna, which are often misidentified for Tridacna gigas, the most commonly intended species referred to as "the giant clam".

Tridacna gigas is one of the most endangered clam species. Antonio Pigafetta documented these in his journal as early as 1521. They are also found off the shores of the Philippines and in the South China Sea in the coral reefs of Sabah (Malaysian Borneo).

The giant clam lives in flat coral sand or broken coral and can be found at depths of as much as 20 m (66 ft). Its range covers the Indo-Pacific, but populations are diminishing quickly, and the giant clam has become extinct in many areas where it was once common. The maxima clam has the largest geographical distribution among giant clam species; it can be found off high- or low-elevation islands, in lagoons or fringing reefs. Its rapid growth rate is likely due to its ability to cultivate algae in its body tissue.

Although larval clams are planktonic, they become sessile in adulthood. The creature's mantle tissues act as a habitat for the symbiotic single-celled dinoflagellate algae (zooxanthellae) from which the adult clams get most of their nutrition. By day, the clam opens its shell and extends its mantle tissue so that the algae receive the sunlight they need to photosynthesise.

Anatomy 
Young T. gigas are difficult to distinguish from other species of Tridacninae. Adult T. gigas are the only giant clams unable to close their shells completely. Even when closed, part of the mantle is visible, unlike the very similar T. derasa. However, this can only be recognized with increasing age and growth. Small gaps always remain between shells through which retracted brownish-yellow mantle can be seen.

Tridacna gigas has four or five vertical folds in its shell; this is the main characteristic that separates it from the similar shell of T. derasa, which has six or seven vertical folds. As with massive deposition of coral matrices composed of calcium carbonate, the bivalves containing zooxanthellae have a tendency to grow massive calcium carbonate shells. The mantle's edges are packed with symbiotic zooxanthellae that presumably utilize carbon dioxide, phosphates, and nitrates supplied by the clam.

The mantle border itself is covered in several hundred eyespots about .5mm in diameter. Each one consists of a small cavity containing a pupil-like aperture and a base of one hundred or more photoreceptors. These receptors allow T. gigas to respond to sudden dimming of light by withdrawing their mantles and partially closing their shells, presumably to protect from potential predators. They do not retract their mantles in response to increased illumination, but it has been observed that a change in the direction of light results in a shift in mantle orientation. In addition to a dimming response, T. gigas also responds to the movement of an object before a shadow has been cast. In order for this to happen, an image forming optical system is required as the response is based on the local dimming of one part of the generated image relative to the rest. This sequential dimming of receptors caused by the movement of a dark object allows enough time for the mantle to be retracted before a potential predator is directly overhead and casting a shadow.

Largest specimens 
The largest known T. gigas specimen measured . It was discovered around 1817 on the north western coast of Sumatra, Indonesia, and its shells are now on display in a museum in Northern Ireland.

Another unusually large giant clam was found in 1956 off the Japanese island of Ishigaki. However, it was not examined scientifically before 1984.

Ecology

Feeding 
While giant clams filter-feed, symbiotic algae provide them with an essential supplementary source of nutrition. These plants consist of unicellular algae, whose metabolic products add to the clam's filter food. This enables giant clams to grow as large as one meter in length even in nutrient-poor coral-reef waters. The clams cultivate algae in a special circulatory system which enables them to keep a substantially higher number of symbionts per unit of volume.

In very small clams— dry tissue weight—filter feeding provides about 65% of total carbon needed for respiration and growth; larger clams (10 g) acquire only 34% of carbon from this source. A single species of zooxenthellae may be symbionts of both giant clams and nearby reef–building (hermatypic) corals.

Reproduction 
Tridacna gigas reproduce sexually and are hermaphrodites (producing both eggs and sperm). Self-fertilization is not possible, but this characteristic does allow them to reproduce with any other member of the species. This reduces the burden of finding a compatible mate, while simultaneously doubling the number of offspring produced by the process.  As with all other forms of sexual reproduction, hermaphroditism ensures that new gene combinations be passed to further generations.

Since giant clams cannot move themselves, they adopt broadcast spawning, releasing sperm and eggs into the water. A transmitter substance called spawning induced substance (SIS) helps synchronize the release of sperm and eggs to ensure fertilization. The substance is released through a syphonal outlet. Other clams can detect SIS immediately. Incoming water passes chemoreceptors situated close to the incurrent syphon, which transmit the information directly to the cerebral ganglia, a simple form of brain.

Detection of SIS stimulates the giant clam to swell its mantle in the central region and to contract its adductor muscle. Each clam then fills its water chambers and closes the incurrent syphon. The shell contracts vigorously with the adductor's help, so the excurrent chamber's contents flows through the excurrent syphon. After a few contractions containing only water, eggs and sperm appear in the excurrent chamber and then pass through the excurrent syphon into the water. Egg release initiates the reproductive process. An adult T. gigas can release more than 500 million eggs at a time.

Spawning seems to coincide with incoming tides near the second (full), third, and fourth (new) quarters of the moon phase. Spawning contractions occur every two or three minutes, with intense spawning ranging from thirty minutes to two and a half hours. Clams that do not respond to the spawning of neighboring clams may be reproductively inactive.

Development 

The fertilized egg floats in the sea for about 12 hours until eventually a larva (trochophore) hatches. It then starts to produce a calcium carbonate shell. Two days after fertilization it measures . Soon it develops a "foot," which is used to move on the ground; it can also swim to search for appropriate habitat.

At roughly one week of age, the clam settles on the ground, although it changes location frequently within the first few weeks. The larva does not yet have symbiotic algae, so it depends completely on plankton. Free floating zooxanthellae are also captured while filtering food. Eventually the front adductor muscle disappears and the rear muscle moves into the clam's center. Many small clams die at this stage. It is difficult to observe the growth rate of T. gigas in the wild, but laboratory-reared giant clams have been observed to grow  a year.

Human relevance 

The main reason that giant clams are becoming endangered is likely to be intensive exploitation by bivalve fishing vessels. Mainly large adults are killed, since they are the most profitable.

The giant clam is considered a delicacy in Japan (known as himejako), France, Southeast Asia and many Pacific Islands. Some Asian foods include the meat from the muscles of clams. On the black market, giant clam shells are sold as decorative accoutrements. At times large amounts of money were paid for the adductor muscle, which Chinese people believed have aphrodisiac powers.

Legend 
As is often the case with uncharacteristically large species, the giant clam has been historically misunderstood. It was known in times past as the "killer clam" and "man-eating clam", and reputable scientific and technical manuals once claimed that the great mollusc had caused deaths; versions of the U.S. Navy Diving Manual even gave detailed instructions for releasing oneself from its grasp by severing the adductor muscles used to close its shell.

In an account of the discovery of the Pearl of Lao Tzu, Wilburn Cobb said he was told that a Dyak diver was drowned when the Tridacna closed its shell on his arm.

Today the giant clam is considered neither aggressive nor particularly dangerous. While it is certainly capable of gripping a person, the shell's closing action is defensive, not aggressive, and the shell valves close too slowly to pose a serious threat. Furthermore, many large individuals are unable to completely close their shells.

Aquaculture 
Mass culture of giant clams began at the Micronesian Mariculture Demonstration Center in Palau (Belau). A large Australian government-funded project from 1985 to 1992 mass-cultured giant clams, particularly T. gigas at James Cook University's Orpheus Island Research Station, and supported the development of hatcheries in the Pacific Islands and the Philippines. Recent developments in aquaculture, specifically at Harbor Branch Oceanographic Institute in Fort Pierce, Florida, and in the Marshall Islands, have succeeded in tank-raising T. gigas, both for use in home aquariums and for release into the wild.

Seven of the ten known species of giant clams in the world are found in the coral reefs of the South China Sea. A programme to propagate endangered giant clams for release into the wild has been ongoing since 2007. Undertaken by the Marine Ecology Research Centre (www.merc-gayana.com) based in Gaya Island just west of Sabah's capital, Kota Kinabalu, the programme successfully nurtured all seven species of the giant clams found in Malaysian waters to sufficient maturity for them to be placed in an ocean nursery for the first time during an awareness month from 22 March until 22 April 2012 in Maloham Bay. This marine awareness month had been planned to highlight and celebrate MERC's success in raising the giant clam larvae (called "spats") to juvenile stage, to highlight the importance of the giant clams and to raise awareness and support with the general public on the threats that are faced by the giant clams within the sea. During this marine awareness month, the coral restoration programme entered its final stage and attachment of 1000 one-year-old coral fragments grown at MERC's ocean nursery onto the coral reef were done throughout the month. The coral restoration programme is aimed to provide the giant clams with a suitable home surroundings when they are big enough in the future to be placed onto the reef.

Conservation status 
There is concern among conservationists about whether those who use the species as a source of livelihood are overexploiting it. The numbers in the wild have been greatly reduced by extensive harvesting for food and the aquarium trade. The species is listed in Appendix II of the Convention on International Trade in Endangered Species (CITES) meaning international trade (including in parts and derivatives) is regulated.

Gallery

See also 
Platyceramus, the largest bivalve in the fossil record

References

Cited sources

Further reading
Schwartzmann C, G Durrieu, M Sow, P Ciret, CE. Lazareth and J-C Massabuau. (2011) In situ giant clam growth rate behavior in relation to temperature: a one-year coupled study of high-frequency non-invasive valvometry and sclerochronology. Limnol. Oceanogr. 56(5): 1940–1951 (Open access)

External links 

 ARKive – images and movies of the giant clam (Tridacna gigas)
 Tridacna gigas entry on Animal Diversity Web
 Giant clam conservation research project at Universiti Sains Malaysia
 Giant Clams of the Great Barrier Reef
Microdocs : The solar powered clam  & Growing a giant clam 
MolluSCAN eye project , a website dedicated to the in situ study of bivalve mollusks around the world
 

Bivalves described in 1758
Taxa named by Carl Linnaeus
Tridacna